WPTJ (90.7 FM) is a radio station broadcasting a Christian format. Licensed to Paris, Kentucky, United States, the station serves the Lexington area.  The station is owned by Somerset Educational Broadcasting Foundation.

History

The station began broadcasting in August 2003, and was owned by Lay Witness Broadcasting. In 2018, the station was sold to Somerset Educational Broadcasting Foundation for $240,000.

References

External links

PTJ
Radio stations established in 2003
2003 establishments in Kentucky
Paris, Kentucky